The Silver Arrow (Swedish: "Silverpilen") is the nickname of a Stockholm Metro train which features in several urban legends alleging sightings of the train's ghost.

Production and history
The train is usually referred to as being composed of silver aluminum model C5 cars. Only one such train, composed of eight cars, was built; it was manufactured in the mid-1960s as a test unit. In a fleet of hundreds of green metro trains, Silverpilen was the only one of the trains that had not been painted and therefore remained silver. Apart from its color, air suspension, a whining distinctive motor sound and the outlying sliding doors (hence the increased passenger capacity), it was almost identical to the other metro trains in service during its lifespan. Some passengers disliked its 'raw' unpainted look.

Starting from the point at which it was taken into production in the mid-1960s, up until 1996, Silverpilen was sometimes used as a backup train; particularly during rush hour. The train was used as backup on all the existing Stockholm underground lines, although more commonly on the Red and Green lines. Before and after its passenger operation it used to run without passengers to the depot without stopping, something some people found odd.

The interior of the cars were devoid of the usual advertisements and the walls bore signs of partly removed graffiti. This scruffy look contributed to the reputation of Silverpilen as "different".

The train was used in the 1993 film Sökarna ("The Seekers") a film which took place in Stockholm. In the film, Neo-Nazi supporters can be seen abusing immigrants on Silverpilen as it approaches Kungsträdgården metro station. Two people are later killed as they get pushed onto the track by the neo-Nazis and subsequently run over by the train, whose driver is powerless to stop in time.

Urban legends
The silver train was only rarely seen by the average Stockholm dweller.

The background for the ghost stories associated with Silverpilen may be related to the eerie look of Silverpilen if seen arriving late at night to an open-air underground station. People were used to green metro trains and were surprised at the arrival of a silver colored train, particularly if they had lived in Stockholm all their life and were unaware of the existence of the unpainted unit.

If the traveler was tired or drunk at the time, their imagination might have run away with them. The stories that circulated most widely in the 1980s have been retold by the noted Swedish folklorist Bengt af Klintberg, and later featured in the December 10, 1997 installment of Det spökar; a television series dedicated to allegedly real ghost stories and haunted houses.

There are different versions of this urban legend. Some say that the ghost train has only been seen in abandoned tunnels by subway workers. Others say that anyone can see it passing the stations at high speed after midnight. Some even claim that Silverpilen sometimes stops to pick up passengers, who then disappear forever or later get off weeks, months or even years after they embarked. The inside of the train is described as being empty, or as containing one or several ghost passengers.

Some stories connect the ghost train with the abandoned Kymlinge metro station on Line 11, the blue line. Kymlinge also has a reputation of being a ghost station, with people saying that "Bara de döda stiger av i Kymlinge" ("Only the dead get off at Kymlinge"). Some say that it stops at a station that has no exit. Kymlinge station was half-built during the construction of the blue metro lines, in anticipation of a residence area nearby, but the sub-city of Sundbyberg decided it would ruin the green space, so nothing was built there.

References 

 af Klintberg, Bengt, Råttan i pizzan. Stockholm: Norstedts Förlag, 1992. 

Urban legends
Phantom vehicles
Rail transport in Stockholm
Stockholm metro